Phacellothrix is a genus of flowering plants in the pussy's-toes tribe within the daisy family.

Species
The only known species is Phacellothrix cladochaeta, native to Australia (Queensland + Northern Territory) and  Papua New Guinea.

References

Monotypic Asteraceae genera
Gnaphalieae
Flora of Australia
Flora of New Guinea
Asteraceae genera
Taxa named by Ferdinand von Mueller